Thiruvisaipa (Tamil: திருவிசைப்பா Thiru means "respect", visai means "action" and pa indicates "poem") denotes the ninth volumes of the Tirumurai, the twelve-volume collection of Tamil Saivite devotional poetry. The works of eight authors belonging to the 10th century, namely Thirumaligai Thevar, Senthanar, Karuvur Thevar, Ponnthuruthi Nambi Kata Nambi, Kandarathithar, Venattadigal, Thiruvaliyamuthanar, Purshottama Nambi, Sethiyar and Senthanar. Out of the eight, Kandarathithar, was a Chola king, who an ardent devotee of Shiva. He wanted to compile Thevaram, but the mission was completed by his grandson Rajaraja I.

The poems
The ninth volume of Tirumurai is composed by Tamil poets (known as Nayanars) - Thirumaligai Thevar, Senthanar, Karuvur Thevar, Ponnthuruthi Nambi Kata Nambi, Kandarathithar, Venattadigal, Thiruvaliyamuthanar, Purshottama Nambi, Sethiyar and Senthanar    Among the eight, Kandarathithar, was a prince descended from Chola king, Parantaka I. He and his wife Sembian Mahadevi were ardent devotees of Shiva and wanted to compile Thevaram during his life time, but could not complete the mission. During the reign of Rajaraja Chola I in the 10th century, a collection of these songs was found abandoned in the Chidambaram temple, along with other religious literary works, and collated by Nambiyandar Nambi.

List of Temple associated with Tiruvisaippa
There are 14 temples revered by the hymns of Thiruvisaippa and are in turn referred as "Tiruvisaipa Thalangal".

Notes

References

 
 
 

Tamil-language literature
Carnatic music
Texts related to Nayanar saints
Hindu texts